Diocesan School for Girls can refer to:

Ireland
 The Diocesan School for Girls, Dublin, merged with The High School, Dublin in 1974

New Zealand
 Diocesan School for Girls (Auckland)
 Waikato Diocesan School, Hamilton

South Africa
 Diocesan School for Girls, Grahamstown, Eastern Cape 
 St. Mary's Diocesan School for Girls, Kloof, KwaZulu-Natal
 St. John's Diocesan School for Girls Pietermaritzburg, KwaZulu-Natal

See also
 Diocesan Girls' School